Elias Ledile Ngwepe (born 4 March 1978) is a South African former soccer player who played as left-back or left-winger for Maritzburg United, Mamelodi Sundowns, Bloemfontein Celtic, Winners Park, Pietersburg Pillars and Platinum Stars.

References

1978 births
Living people
South African soccer players
Mamelodi Sundowns F.C. players
Association football midfielders
Maritzburg United F.C. players
Bloemfontein Celtic F.C. players
Platinum Stars F.C. players
People from Polokwane
Association football defenders
Winners Park F.C. players
Sportspeople from Limpopo